"You Got the Floor" is a single by American guitarist and singer Arthur Adams. It entered the UK Singles Chart on 24 October 1981, reaching a peak position of number 38 and remaining on the chart for five weeks.

The record originally appeared on the small US label Inculcation, owned by actor Bernie Hamilton, who produced the track.

References

External links 
Arthur Adams Band homepage

1981 singles
RCA Records singles
1981 songs
Song articles with missing songwriters